The Puya is a river in Velsky and Shenkursky Districts of Arkhangelsk Oblast in Russia. It is a left tributary of the Vaga. The area of its basin . The major tributary is the Sulanda (left).

The source of the Puya is located close to Yemenga, a village and a former station on the demolished railway line between Yura and Tyogrozero. It flows to the north-east, and in the selo of Georgievskoye turns south-east. Downstream from Georgievskoe, the valley of the Puya is populated, and on the left bank the road connecting Dolmatovo (on one of the principal highways in Russia, M8 connecting Moscow and Arkhangelsk) and Kargopol via Nyandoma has been built. In Dolmatovo, the Puya turns north, and M8 follows it on the right bank. Downstream from the mouth of the Sulanda, the Puya turns east. The mouth of the Puya is located in the village of Aksyonovskaya.

References

External links 
 

Rivers of Arkhangelsk Oblast